Eterna is a Swiss luxury watch company founded in Grenchen, Canton Solothurn, on 7 November 1856 by Josef Girard and Urs Schild. The company is now owned by Hong Kong-based Citychamp Watch & Jewellery Group Limited, an investment holding company formerly known as China Haidian Holdings.

History
On 7 November 1856, Dr. Joseph Girard and Urs Schild, a 28-year-old school teacher, founded the ébauche factory "Dr. Girard & Schild“. Eight years later the enterprise set out the mutual rights and obligations of employees and employers in writing. Urs Schild became a National Councilor in 1882. Six years later, he died at the age of 58. After the death of Urs Schild, his son Max took over the company and soon made a business trip to the United States. He returned to introduce machinery to the craftsmen. Max Schild was ahead of his time and his ideas were unpopular. Discouraged, he left the company and handed power over to his brother Theodore, with whom Eterna entered a prosperous 20th century.

In the 1900s, wristwatches were just starting to become fashionable. Schild Fréres, as the company was then known, started to produce ladies’ wristwatches adapted from small pocket watches. In 1905, the company changed its name to Eterna. The company continued to be at the leading edge of watch development, and in 1908 it patented the first alarm wristwatch. The watch went into production in 1914 and was launched at the Swiss National Exhibition in Bern that year.

By 1932, Eterna had set up a subsidiary company, ETA SA, to make movements for itself and other Swiss watch companies. This same year, Theodore retired and handed over the control of the company to his nephew Rudolf Schild. Theodore remained on the board of directors after retirement until his death in 1950.

Eterna produced many innovations in their history: the smallest production wristwatch with a Baguette movement in 1930, an eight-day alarm watch in the 1930s and their first automatic watch in 1938.

In 1948, Eterna advanced self-winding watch technology with the development of the Eterna-matic automatic movement. The use of five strategically placed ball bearings made the movement very efficient and significantly reduced friction and resistance on the oscillating weight that wound the mainspring. This reduced the wear and tear on internal parts, increasing the watch’s accuracy and useful life. The new watch became popular, and is probably the most famous Eterna watch and may be one of Eterna’s greatest designs. Its popularity was such that in 1948 Eterna adopted the image of five balls as its corporate logo.

After 1982, Eterna was sold several times. By 1995, it was owned by FAP Beteiligungs GmbH. In 1999, Eterna produced a range of watches marketed under the Porsche Design label. Porsche Design sold Eterna to International Volant Ltd, a subsidiary of China Haidian on 30 June 2012. China Haidian was renamed in 2014 to Citychamp Watch & Jewellery Group Limited.

In the 2000s Eterna resumed manufacturing watches and creating the Calibre 6036 in 2004. The ultra-thin automatic 3030 was produced for the 150th anniversary in 2006. In 2009, a half-century after the Eterna-Matic, the "Spherodrive" once again highlighted the significance of tiny ball-bearings in mechanical watchmaking. The company remains active in wristwatch design.

Milestones

 The 1870s: The first watch built entirely in-house
 1908: Patent filed for the world’s first wrist alarm clock
 1910: "Grand Prix" honors at the Brussels World Exhibition
 1914: The first serially-produced wrist alarm clock is introduced
 1930: Designs of the smallest production wristwatch with a "baguette" movement
 1948: Birth of the friction-reducing ball-bearing mounted rotor system and production of the Eterna-Matic
 1947: The "Kon-Tiki", a tribute to the expedition of the Norwegian explorer Thor Heyerdahl in 1947
 The 1950s: Actresses including Gina Lollobrigida and Brigitte Bardot wear the "Golden Heart"
 1956: The 100th anniversary "Centenaire" automatic.
 1962: The thinnest men's watch with an automatic movement and a date window, the "Eterna-Matic 3000 Dato" with a movement height of 3.6 mm.
 The 1980s: The "Museum" line breaks the thinness record in all categories. The quartz wristwatch has a thickness of only 0.98 mm.
 1980: Eterna receives the "Grand Prix Triomphe de l'Excellence Européenne".
 2006: For the company's 150th anniversary the automatic calibre 3030 is released.

Collections
 Adventic
 Vaughan
 Madison
 Heritage
 Centenaire
 1948
 KonTiki
 Tangaroa
 Artena
 Contessa
 Eternity

Gallery

References

External links
 Official website

Swiss watch brands
Watch manufacturing companies of Switzerland
Companies based in the canton of Solothurn
Companies established in 1856
Grenchen